Castelvecchio di Barga, officially Castelvecchio Pascoli, is a village in Tuscany in central Italy. Administratively, it is a frazione of the comune of Barga, in the province of Lucca, in the Serchio Valley, where poet Giovanni Pascoli bought the house "Cardosi-Carrara".

History

Giovanni Pascoli spent much of his time in Castelvecchio, dedicating himself to poetry and studies in classical literature. Here he seemed to have finally rebuilt the "nest" – his family's traditional residence; the original in San Mauro was destroyed.

The Casa museo Pascoli is still visited today. Giovanni Pascoli and his sister Mariù are buried in the adjacent chapel.

Sports 

The sports company "Il Ciocco" hosted, in 1991, the second edition of the UCI Mountain Bike World Championships.

References

External links

History museums in Italy
Cities and towns in Tuscany
Frazioni of Barga, Tuscany